The Saskatoon Freeway (formerly the Saskatoon Perimeter Highway) is a proposed four-lane limited access highway in and adjacent to Saskatoon, Saskatchewan. The  route will connect Highway 11 (south) with Highway 7, forming a partial ring road around the city of Saskatoon. When complete, it will serve as a replacement bypass route for the existing Circle Drive.

Route description 
The Saskatoon Freeway is expected to be a four-lane highway that begins at Highway 11 south of Saskatoon and connects with Highway 7 west of the city, and will consist of:
  of new roadway
 16 interchanges
 5 railway overpasses
 2 flyovers
 1 major river crossing

The project is divided into three phases. Phases 1, the northern leg, runs from Highway 16 (west) to the South Saskatchewan River, and includes major interchanges at Highway 12 (Idylwyld Drive) and Highway 11 (north). As part of the project, Highway 11 would continue in Saskatoon along Wanuskewin Road (which becomes Warman Road and 2nd Avenue), while its current connection to Idylwyld Drive would permanently closed. Phase 2, the eastern leg, runs from the South Saskatchewan River to Highway 11 (south), and will included connections with Highway 41, Highway 5, 8th Street, and Highway 16 (east). Phase 3, the western leg, runs from Highway 16 (west) to the Highway 7/60 intersection, and includes a connection with Highway 14. The project does not include a southeastern leg which would connect Highway 7 to Highway 11 (south) and complete the circle and it has been determined that the southwest leg of Circle Drive, completed in 2013, is sufficient to handle traffic for the foreseeable future.

The Functional Planning Study for Phase 1 was completed in February 2020, with the remainder scheduled to be completed in 2021. There is no timeline for construction.

It remains to be seen what highway number(s) will be assigned to the Saskatoon Freeway; however, when the Regina Bypass opened, Highway 1 and Highway 11 were moved to the new roadway.

Much as Circle Drive, at the time of its initial construction, encompassed most existing development in Saskatoon, the Saskatoon Freeway as currently routed will encompass most current and near-future development of the city, though some land within the city limits and beyond the freeway has been earmarked for future industrial, commercial and residential development.

Exit list 
The following is a list of future proposed interchanges, heading counter-clockwise.

See also
 Regina Bypass
 Stoney Trail - a similar bypass in Calgary, Alberta
 Anthony Henday Drive - a similar bypass in Edmonton, Alberta
 Perimeter Highway - a similar bypass in Winnipeg, Manitoba

References

External links
 Saskatoon Freeway

Streets in Saskatoon
Freeways in Saskatchewan
Ring roads in Canada
Proposed roads in Canada